Richemont-Banchereau (first name unknown, born 1612, Saumur) was a 17th-century French lawyer and playwright.

A lawyer in Parlement, Banchereau is known only by two plays he wrote aged twenty, published in Paris in 1632:
 L'Espérance glorieuse ou Amour et Justice, tragicomedy in five acts and in verse (dedicated to the Prince of Condé)
 Les Passions égarées ou le Roman du temps, tragicomedy in five acts and in verse.

Sources 
 Antoine de Léris, Dictionnaire portatif historique et littéraire des théâtres, contenant l'origine des differens théâtres de Paris, seconde édition, revue, corrigée & considérablement augmentée, Paris, C. A. Jombert, 1758.
 Nouvelle biographie générale depuis les temps les plus reculés jusqu'à nos jours avec les renseignements bibliographiques et l'indication des sources à consulter, publiée par MM. Firmin Didot frères, sous la direction de M. le Dr. Hoefer, 1852.
 Pierre Larousse, Grand dictionnaire universel du XIXe siècle, 15 vol. 1863-1890

References

External links 
 Richemont-Banchereau on CÉSAR

17th-century French lawyers
17th-century French male writers
17th-century French dramatists and playwrights
1612 births
People from Saumur
Year of death unknown